The European Union Centre in Taiwan (EUTW) is a university alliance in Taiwan, funded by European Commission, founded by National Taiwan University (NTU). Its headquarter is also located in NTU.

History
Since 1998, the European Union (EU) began establishing European Union Centres (variations in name) at prestigious universities in developed countries around the world. As of 2016, there are 32 such centres around the world, such as United States,  Canada, Japan, Korea, Australia, Russia, New Zealand, Taiwan, and Singapore.

In 2008, the European Union Centre in Taiwan (EUTW) consortium consists of seven most comprehensive/internationalization Taiwanese universities, the National Taiwan University (NTU) signed the Grand Agreement with the European Commission. In 2009, the EUTW university alliance was founded.

Members

See also
List of universities in Taiwan
University alliances in Taiwan
University System of Taiwan
Taiwan Comprehensive University System
University System of Taipei
National University System of Taiwan
ELECT
National Taiwan University System (NTU Triangle)
Public Ivy

References

External links
European Union Centre in Taiwan 

University systems in Taiwan
2009 establishments in Taiwan
Educational institutions established in 2009